= List of ambassadors of Singapore to Laos =

Singapore Ambassador to Lao People's Democratic Republic
- Incumbent; Sudesh Keshavlal Maniar since 2023
- Inaugural holder: Tan Seng Chye
- Formation: 2 December 1974; 51 years ago

This is a list of ambassadors of Singapore to the Lao People's Democratic Republic

Ambassador	Tenure	Ref.
Tan Seng Chye	1997 – 2000	
Seetoh Hoy Cheng	2000 – 2003	
Karen Tan	2004 – 2007	
Benjamin Jeyaraj William	2007 – 2011	
Dileep Nair	2011 – 2013	
Kang Siew Kheng	2013 – 2014	
Dominic Goh	2015 – 2019	
Leow Siu Lin	2019 – 2023	
Sudesh Keshavlal Maniar	2023 – present	
